Nizhnyaya Zaninka is a rural locality (a village) in Vyatkinskoye Rural Settlement, Sudogodsky District, Vladimir Oblast, Russia. The population was 16 as of 2010.

Geography 
Nizhnyaya Zaninka is located 44 km northwest of Sudogda (the district's administrative centre) by road. Vaneyevka is the nearest rural locality.

References 

Rural localities in Sudogodsky District